Walmer Road Baptist Church is a  Baptist in Toronto, Ontario, Canada. It is affiliated with Canadian Baptists of Ontario and Quebec.

History
Early in 1889 Elmore Harris, then pastor Bloor Street Baptist Church (later to become Yorkminster Park Baptist Church), became convinced that there was need for a new ministry in the area in north-western part of Toronto that had been recently annexed to the city. After consulting with his congregation it was decided that Walmer Road was the most suitable spot for the church. Elmore Harris' father, Alanson Harris of Brantford (founder of A. Harris, Son & Co. Ltd.) purchased the lot on Walmer Road at the corner of what was soon to become Lowther Avenue, at a cost of $7,600.

In April 1889, Elmore Harris resigned as pastor of Bloor Street Church, effective October 15, 1889. The first building (which can now be identified by the short tower some distance west along Lowther Avenue) was completed and opened on October 20, 1889. Sixty-two people transferred from the Bloor Street Church and became the Charter members. By 1891 the membership was already about 350 and in December it was decided that more space was necessary. Mr. Alanson Harris and Mrs. John Harris, immediately agreed to provide the funds. And what is now the main sanctuary of the church was erected at a cost of $70,000. Upon completion it was the largest Baptist building in Canada. The dedication of the new sanctuary took place on November 6, 1892.

Throughout its more than 125 years, Walmer Road Baptist Church has been a community of believers with a commitment to outreach and service in the Annex and a strong reputation for creative leadership by skilled pastors and involved lay people. A detailed history of the church can be found in two documents: A Century for the City published in 1989 and Walmer at 125 published in 2014.

Architecture
Walmer Road Baptist Church was designed and built in 1889 and 1892 in the Gothic Revival style by the architectural firm of Henry Langley and his nephew Edmund Burke. The interior of the church was built to accommodate 1540 people on the floor and in the galleries. The church entered its next and last building program in 1912. A new structure was erected in the space between the two older buildings, and was dedicated as the Ruth Shenstone Harris Memorial Church School on January 18, 1914. A comprehensive renovation of this Education Wing was undertaken in 2000.

Outreach
Outreach and church planting was a key activity of the church from the very beginning. Christie Street Mission was founded in 1898 by the congregation from Walmer Road. In 1907 it became Christie Street Baptist Church under pastor H. R. Nobles.

Spadina Road Mission was born in 1907 to serve the area at Spadina and St. Clair Ave. In 1914 the Mission merged with Wychwood Road Baptist Church just to the west, when a new bridge across the ravine brought that church within easy reach.

Hewitt Avenue Mission was begun in 1909 in the Brockton Village neighbourhood (now Roncesvalles, Toronto) on Hewitt Avenue. It eventually became High Park Baptist Church.

Memorial Institute became a ministry of Walmer in October 1911, when they agreed to take over the work of Memorial Baptist Church, on Tecumseth Street south west of Queen and Bathurst in downtown Toronto. A significant ministry to poor people living in downtown Toronto continued in this location until 1942 when it ceased operation.

Training the laity
In 1894, Elmore Harris and Dr. William Stewart, a Walmer supporter, suggested that the church provide space for a lay training institute to be known as the Toronto Bible Training School. Stewart became the first principal. Courses were held at Walmer Road church for the first four years and then they relocated to new facilities at 110 College Street in 1898. The vision of the founders was to train laypeople as Sunday School teachers, pastors' assistants, and as city, home and foreign missionaries. Initially the training program was two years. In 1912 it became the Toronto Bible College and is now the Tyndale University College and Seminary.

During Howard Bentall's time as pastor in the 1950s, a vision for a lay training institute was once again revived and beginning in September 1955 the Baptist Training Institute (BTI) was formed. It was designed as a one-year lay training program and at first, classes were conducted at the church. In 1959, BTI was relocated to Brantford, Ontario.

Pastors
Elmore Harris served from October 1889 to November 27, 1895, when he resigned as pastor on account of failing health. Harris continued to serve in an advisory capacity until his death in 1911. Rev. W. W. Weeks, from First Baptist Church, Moncton, New Brunswick, began at Walmer Road Church in December 1895. The membership at that date was 480. By 1900 it was 700. Mr. Weeks was considered "an earnest preacher and a most indefatigable worker". He served until 1904. Weeks was followed in 1905 by Oliver Horsman from New Jersey, but he was soon involved in a doctrinal controversy and resigned in January, 1906.

John MacNeill arrived in 1906 from First Baptist Church in Winnipeg. At 32 years old he already had a growing reputation as a preacher and evangelist. He had studied at McMaster University and knew Toronto well. He proved to be the pastor Walmer needed at a difficult time. During his 23 years at Walmer, the church grew to a membership of over 2,000. MacNeill resigned in 1930 to become the Principal of the Theological Faculty of McMaster University. At the same time McMaster was relocated to Hamilton Ontario.

The man chosen in 1930 to fill the enormous shoes of John MacNeill was Dr. Herbert H. Bingham. Coming from First Baptist Calgary, Bingham faced a difficult task. Although a strong preacher and evangelist, and much-loved by the congregation, he faced the twin challenges of succeeding a beloved and famous pastor, and leading the church through a time of great economic hardship. It is said of him, however, that he never became discouraged, even in the darkest days of the depression. In 10 1/2 years, he added 766 members, over 350 by baptism.

In June 1940, Dr. Bingham resigned to become the first full-time general secretary of the Baptist Convention of Ontario and Quebec, and in these early days of World War II, the church turned to Adiel Jarrett Moncrief, who began his ministry October 26, 1941. Like Bingham, Moncrief came from a large church (First Baptist Church in Tampa, Florida), was the author of numerous books and had an excellent reputation as a leader. Walmer represented a significant challenge. Moncrief's main task was to pastor a church in wartime; the atmosphere in the congregation was a sense of a painful task that must be done. He served effectively through the war years but on December 28, 1945, Adiel Moncrief submitted his resignation.

In 1947 Walmer Road called Howard Bentall, a young Western Canadian, the pastor of First Baptist, Regina. He possessed a gift they valued highly: preaching. Bentall arrived November 3, 1946, and the results of his ministry were soon evident. The next decade saw growth in many areas including work with young people and ESL programs as well as a renewed commitment to mission. In 1959, Howard Bentall resigned, after almost 13 years of very fruitful ministry—a period of service second only in length to John MacNeill's. During those years, about 800 members were added, 215 by baptism.

When Bentall left for First Baptist Church, Calgary, he was replaced by a Maritimer, Harvey L. Denton, who commenced his ministry on September 20, 1959. Denton came from Murray Street Baptist in Peterborough. Much of Denton's relatively brief time at Walmer—he retired in 1963—would be spent assessing the implications a report on ministry.

In 1963 Harvey Denton resigned. He was followed by Reginald S. Dunn, also from the Atlantic provinces. Reg Dunn was a leader and enabler. Dunn came to Walmer on February 6, 1964, after 11 years at First Baptist Church in Montreal and would facilitate one of the most exciting phases of ministry in Walmer's history. Reg Dunn had a very simple philosophy: work hard in one area; that area was community outreach. However he maintained a traditional program within the church allowing the familiarity of the worship, and the educational and social programs within Walmer to provide the stability needed to support the outreach. He served as President of the Canadian Council of Churches from 1966 to 1969. In 1971, Reg Dunn resigned, moving to Amherst, Nova Scotia.

To lead Walmer through the 1970s, the congregation turned to Bruce W. Neal, an Ontario native, from James Street Baptist Church in Hamilton. He arrived at Walmer in 1973 with a reputation as an excellent preacher and worship leader. He was also noted for being in touch with the real world. Neal's 12 years at Walmer saw a growing young adult ministry and a renewed look at worship. Bruce Neal resigned in the spring of 1984. The length of his tenure as senior pastor was exceeded only by those of MacNeill and Bentall.

In October 1984, Dr. Daniel Dryer arrived bringing a love for the city and a renewed concern for the Annex community. Under his leadership a number of innovative moves were made in the lead up to the celebration of Walmer's centennial in 1989 including the establishment of house groups as a formal part of the church's discipleship program. During this time the BCOQ's BUILD program was partially housed at the church. At the end of 1993 Dan Dryer retired.

In July 1995, Michael Blair was called to be the new senior pastor. Blair brought an effective preaching ministry as well as administrative skills. He helped the church work toward a new structure for leadership and guided the church to create the concept of the Walmer Centre in preparation for the major renovation of the education wing of the church that was undertaken in 2000. In 2001 Michael Blair resigned.

After a lengthy search, in February 2004, Steve Cox was called as Lead Pastor bringing to the community his deep commitment to evangelism and his considerable skills in guiding worship. Steve's wife, Buff (Elizabeth)—also an ordained minister—joined the pastoral staff as Director of Administration in 2008. Among many other activities, under her guidance a major project "Under the Roof " allowed the replacement of the slate on the north side of the sanctuary roof. However, following a valiant two-year battle with cancer, Buff died in 2012 and in early 2014, Steve Cox resigned after ten years of ministry at Walmer.

In December 2015 Rev. Elaine Poproski from First Baptist Church, Simcoe Ontario, accepted a call to Walmer. She began her ministry here on Palm Sunday 2016.

See also
 Baptists in Canada

Notes

References
 Robertson, John Ross (1904). Landmarks of Toronto, Volume 4. J. Ross Robertson (republished from the Toronto Evening Telegram)
 Toronto Public Library. Toronto's Sanctuaries, Church Designs by Henry Langley: Walmer Road Baptist Church
 Tracy, Frederick (1929). Walmer Road Baptist Church: the Story of Forty Years, Toronto, Ontario, Canada, The Standard Publishing Company.
 Goertz, Donald Aaron, (1989). A Century for the City: Walmer Road Baptist Church, 1889–1989, The Church.
 Weir, Heather, (2014). Walmer at 125: Stories from a Quarter Century of Ministry, The Church.

External links
 Walmer Road Baptist Church site
 High Park Baptist Church site 

1889 establishments in Ontario
19th-century Baptist churches
Baptist churches in Toronto
Churches completed in 1889
19th-century churches in Canada